Chung Shan Medical University (CSMU) is a medical university located in South District, Taichung, Taiwan. Chung Shan Medical University Hospital is affiliated with the university.

CSMU offers a wide range of undergraduate and graduate programs in the fields of medicine, dentistry, nursing, and health sciences.

CSMU has established partnerships with more than 60 universities and institutions worldwide, including the United States, Europe, Japan, and China. The university has also established a dual-degree program with the University of Missouri-Kansas City School of Dentistry.

History
The university was established as Chung Shan Dentistry Specialized School in 1960, by Dr. Chou Ju-chuan (周汝川), a Taiwanese dentist. At first it only provided four year dentistry education, and enrolled only 112 students. In 1962 it changed its name into Chung Shan Medical Specialized School, and provided medical education from then. In 1977, it was upgraded to Chung Shan Medical College, and in August 2001 it was certified by the Ministry of Education as a normalized university named Chung Shan Medical University.

Faculties
 College of Health Care and Management
 College of Medical Science and Technology
 College of Medicine
 College of Humanities and Social Science
 College of Oral Medicine

Student life
There are 76 student clubs divided into six types: autonomy, learned, service, amity, artistry and sports. The university arranges instructors and offers subsidies to the clubs.

Notable alumni
 Chuan Wen-sheng, member of Legislative Yuan
 Ker Chien-ming, member of Legislative Yuan
 Chi-Chao Chan, ophthalmologist who has published over 600 papers and discovered new method of diagnosing primary vitreoretinal lymphoma.

Transportation
The university is accessible within walking distance North East of Daqing Station of the Taiwan Railways and Taichung Metro.

See also
 List of universities in Taiwan

References

External links

Chung Shan Medical University Hospital 

1960 establishments in Taiwan
Educational institutions established in 1960
Universities and colleges in Taichung